Mērsrags Port is the port authority of Mērsrags, Latvia.

References

External links 
 Mērsrags Port website
 https://web.archive.org/web/20141218143202/http://yachts-centre.com/

Ports and harbours of Latvia
Port authorities